Caramac is the brand name for a caramel-based confectionery that was created by Mackintosh's, and is now manufactured by Nestlé. It was first introduced in the United Kingdom in 1959. The name is derived from the syllabic abbreviation of Caramel and Mackintosh.

A similar confection is used in the covering of McVitie's Gold biscuit bar. A limited edition Caramac Kit Kat bar was released in the United Kingdom in 2005 and due to popular demand it was brought back in 2007.

In 2015 a buttons version was launched.

History 
The name of the product was determined in a competition. The competition was held in what was the Norwich factory of Mackintosh's, and won by Barbara Herne. The bar was made at the old Norwich factory until its closure in 1996, when production transferred to Fawdon on Tyneside, where it is still made.

Design 
The bar is a light brown colour and is manufactured using sweetened condensed milk, butter, various flavourings, and sugar. It is packaged in an orange-red and yellow wrapper.

References

External links 
 

Candy bars
Rowntree's brands
Yorkshire cuisine
1959 establishments in the United Kingdom
Products introduced in 1959